Jason Ross Woodforth (born 27 November 1970) is an Australian Liberal National politician who was the member of the Legislative Assembly of Queensland for Nudgee from 2012 to 2015.

Biography
Jason Woodforth was born in Brisbane on 27 November 1970. He was educated at Craigslea and Brisbane State High Schools. He runs a bodybuilding supplements business, Bodyzone sports supplements, and is managing director of supplement importing company International Brands Direct. He also serves as the Australian vice president and Queensland president of the International Natural Bodybuilding Association. He has won a 'promoter's contest' in bodybuilding held by the INBA.

Fluoridation
Woodforth was quoted by the Courier Mail as being in support of ceasing fluoridation of the Queensland water supply. This was at odds with Woodforth's maiden speech, where he was concerned by rising health care costs in Australia. He has been disciplined by prominent Queensland LNP member and former dentist John-Paul Langbroek for these comments, as well as receiving a critical editorial from the Courier Mail. Andrew Wong of the Australian Dental Association agreed with ABC AM interviewer Annie Guest that the LNP was possibly appeasing an "uninformed minority". In this interview, Woodforth avoided answering questions regarding his lack of formal education he had in health care, by stating "What I say to people is you actually don't need letters after your name to work out what's right and what's wrong".

References

1970 births
Living people
Liberal National Party of Queensland politicians
Members of the Queensland Legislative Assembly
People educated at Brisbane State High School
21st-century Australian politicians